Kalhausen (Lorraine Franconian: Kalhuse) is a commune in the Moselle department of the Grand Est administrative region in north-eastern France.

It is the only village belonging to the Pays de Bitche to not be part of the Bitche canton.

Population

See also
 Communes of the Moselle department

References

External links
 

Communes of Moselle (department)